Small group can mean:

 In psychology, a group of 3 to 9 individuals, see communication in small groups
 In mathematics, a group of small order, see list of small groups
 In connection with churches, a cell group
 In jazz, a small ensemble also known as a combo